The Progressive Democratic Party (Malay: Parti Demokratik Progresif, Abbreviation: PDP), formerly known as Sarawak Progressive Democratic Party is a Sarawak based political party in Malaysia founded in 2002. The party was founded in the wake of the de-registration of the Sarawak National Party in November 2002 by a faction aligned to the Chief Minister of Sarawak, Abdul Taib Mahmud, led by William Mawan Ikom. The party has since rebranded in using a new name - Progressive Democratic Party since 2017 and has planned to expand to certain West Malaysian states e.g. Selangor, Negri Sembilan and Johor (where it has established 6 divisions at the moment). It is one of the former component party of the Barisan Nasional coalition. Following the fall of BN in the 2018 general election and in the aftermath of meeting between all Sarawak-based BN coalition parties on 12 June 2018, PDP left the coalition to form a new Sarawak-based coalition of Sarawak Parties Alliance.

Electoral history 
At the 2011 Sarawak state election, PDP won six out of the eight seats it contested.

In the 2013 General Election, all 4 of their candidates won their respective seats, including William Mawan himself, where he won in P205 Saratok, against Ali Biju of PKR.

At the 2021 Sarawak state election, PDP won five out of the six seats it contested.

Elected representatives

Dewan Negara (Senate)

Senators 

 Appointed by His Majesty the Yang di-Pertuan Agong
 Paul Igai

Dewan Rakyat (House of Representatives)

Members of Parliament of the 15th Malaysian Parliament 

PDP has 2 MPs in the House of Representatives.

Dewan Undangan Negeri (State Legislative Assembly)

Malaysian State Assembly Representatives 

Sarawak State Legislative Assembly

General election results

State election results

See also 
:Category:Progressive Democratic Party (Malaysia) politicians

References

Further reading 
 Khoo, Phillip (June 2004) The Taming of the Dayak. Aliran Monthly
 Chin, James. 2004. 'Sabah and Sarawak: The more things change, the more they remain the same', in Chin Kin Wah (ed) Southeast Asian Affairs 2004 (Singapore: Institute of South East Asian Studies, 2004)
 James Chin. 2011. Forced to the Periphery: Recent Chinese Politics in East Malaysia. Singapore: ISEAS

External links 
 

Political parties established in 2002
Political parties in Sarawak
2002 establishments in Malaysia